Art competitions were held as part of the 1948 Summer Olympics in London, Great Britain.  Medals were awarded in five categories (architecture, literature, music, painting, and sculpture), for works inspired by sport-related themes.

The art exhibition was held at the Victoria and Albert Museum from 15 July to 14 August, and displayed works of art from 27 different countries.  The literature competition attracted 44 entries, and the music competition had 36 entries.

The art competitions included multiple subcategories for each of the five artistic categories.  The judges declined to award any medals for dramatic works in literature, and no gold medals in another five subcategories.  Alex Diggelmann of Switzerland won both a silver medal and a bronze medal for two different entries in the applied arts and crafts subcategory, a feat unlikely to be duplicated in any event in the current Olympic program.

These were the last Games in which art competitions were held, after being in the official program for all Games since 1912. At a meeting of the International Olympic Committee in 1949 it was decided to hold art exhibitions instead, as it was judged illogical to permit professionals to compete in the art competitions while only amateurs were permitted to compete in sporting events.  Since 1952 a non-competitive art and cultural festival has been associated with each Games.

Architecture

Literature

Music

Painting and graphic art

Sculpture

Medal table
At the time, medals were awarded to these artists, but art competitions are no longer regarded as official Olympic events by the International Olympic Committee.  These events do not appear in the IOC medal database, and these totals are not included in the IOC's medal table for the 1948 Games.

Events summary

Architecture
Designs for Town Planning

The following architects took part:

Architectural designs

The following architects took part:

Further entries

The following architects took part:

Literature

Dramatic works

The following writers took part:

Epic works

The following writers took part:

Lyric works

The following writers took part:

Unknown event

The following writers took part:

Music

Compositions for orchestra

The following composers took part:
{| width="100%"
|- valign="top"
|

Instrumental and chamber

The following composers took part:
{| width="100%"
|- valign="top"
|

Vocals

The following composers took part:
{| width="100%"
|- valign="top"
|

Unknown event

The following composers took part:
{| width="100%"
|- valign="top"
|

Painting
Graphic arts

The following painters took part:
{| width="100%"
|- valign="top"
|

Paintings

The following painters took part:

Unknown event

The following painters took part:

Applied arts

The following painters took part:

Sculpture
Medals and plaques

The following sculptors took part:
{| width="100%"
|- valign="top"
|

Reliefs

The following sculptors took part:
{| width="100%"
|- valign="top"
|

Statues

The following sculptors took part:

Unknown event

The following sculptors took part:

References

1948 Summer Olympics events
1948
1948 in art
Arts in London